A list of notable people who were at some point a member of the defunct Nazi Party (NSDAP). This is not meant to be a list of every person who was ever a member of the Nazi Party. This is a list of notable figures who were active within the party and did something significant within it that is of historical note or who were members of the Nazi Party according to multiple reliable publications. For a list of the main leaders and most important party figures see: List of Nazi Party leaders and officials.

Overview A–E F–K L–R S–Z

F

Arnold Fanck
Gottfried Feder
Hermann Fegelein
Heinrich Fehlis
Lothar Fendler
Rudolf Fernau
Roderich Fick
Fidus
Karl Fiehler
Gerhard Fieseler
Hans Filbinger
August von Finck, Sr.
Wolfgang Finkelnburg
Hans Fischböck
Eugen Fischer
Franz Joseph Emil Fischer
Fritz Fischer (historian)
Fritz Fischer (medical doctor)
Ludwig Fischer
Josef Fitzthum
Hans Fleischhacker
Ulrich Fleischhauer
Rudolf Fleischmann
Gerhard Flesch
Friedrich Flick
Friedrich Karl Florian
Hermann Florstedt
Otto Förschner
Werner Forßmann
Albert Forster
Theodor Förster
Ernst Forsthoff
Wolfgang Fortner
Hans Frank
Karl Hermann Frank
August Frank
Walter Frank
Kurt Franz
Max Frauendorfer
Alfred Frauenfeld
Oswald Freisler
Roland Freisler
Fritz Freitag
Karl Frenzel
Albert Frey (SS officer)
Erik Frey
Wilhelm Frick
Prince Friedrich Christian of Schaumburg-Lippe
Helmuth Friedrichs
Willy Fritsch
Karl Fritzsch
Gert Fröbe
Carl Froelich
Erich Fuchs
Wilhelm Fuchs
Walther Funk
Ferdinand aus der Fünten

G

Fritz Gajewski
Albert Ganzenmüller
Heinrich Gattineau
Hermann Gauch
Edwin Gebauer
Karl Gebhardt
Arnold Gehlen
Willi Geiger (judge)
Hans-Dietrich Genscher
Gerhard Gentzen
Karl Genzken
Achim Gercke
Herbert Gerigk
Karl Gerland
Kurt Gerstein
Kurt Gerstenberg
Wilhelm Gideon
Gustav Giemsa
Hermann Giesler
Paul Giesler
Kurt Gildisch
Herbert Otto Gille
Ernst Girzick
Hans Bernd Gisevius
Edmund Glaise von Horstenau
Fridolin Glass
Odilo Globocnik
Richard Glücks
Joseph Goebbels
Magda Goebbels
Alexander Golling
Alfons Goppel
Emmy Göring
Hermann Göring
Amon Göth
Curt von Gottberg
Josef Goubeau
Maximilian Grabner
Paul Graener
Siegfried Graetschus
Ulrich Graf
Hermann Grapow
Ernst-Robert Grawitz
Ulrich Greifelt
Josef Greindl
Arthur Greiser
Irma Grese
Wilhelm Grewe
Friedrich Griese
Jakob Grimminger
Josef Grohé
Oskar Gröning,
Heinrich Gross
Walter Gross
Alfred Großrock
Franz Grothe
Kurt Gruber
Walter Grundmann
Adam Grünewald
Günter Guillaume
Otto Günsche
Hans F. K. Günther
Rolf Günther
Wilhelm Gustloff
Erich Gutenberg

H

Werner Haase
Theodor Habicht
Lorenz Hackenholt
Eugen Hadamovsky
Harry Haffner
Ludwig Hahn
Julius Hallervorden
Karl Ritter von Halt
Joachim Hamann
Ernst Hanfstaengl
Karl Hanke
Thea von Harbou
Otto Harder
Arvid Harnack
Heinrich Harrer
Wilhelm Harster
Fritz Hartjenstein
Johannes Hassebroek
Ulrich von Hassell
Jakob Wilhelm Hauer
Paul Hausser
Emil Haussmann
Franz Hayler
Richard von Hegener
Martin Heidegger
Erhard Heiden
Aribert Heim
Heinrich Heim
Karl-Günther Heimsoth
Edmund Heines
Ernst Heinkel
Hans Heinze
August Heißmeyer
Kurt Heißmeyer
Wolf-Heinrich Graf von Helldorf
Otto Hellmuth
Otto Hellwig
Hans Helwig
Konrad Henlein
Wilhelm Henning
Willibald Hentschel
Nikolaus Herbet
Maximilian von Herff
Gottlieb Hering
Albert Herrmann
Rudolf Heß
Prince Christoph of Hesse
Walther Hewel
Erich von der Heyde
Werner Heyde
Lina Heydrich
Reinhard Heydrich
Eduard von der Heydt
Friedrich August von der Heydte
Konstantin Hierl
Dieter Hildebrandt
Friedrich Hildebrandt
Richard Hildebrandt
Erich Hilgenfeldt
Ernst Hermann Himmler
Gebhard Ludwig Himmler
Heinrich Himmler
Margarete Himmler
Hans Hinkel
Fritz Hippler
August Hirt
Adolf Hitler
Karl-Friedrich Höcker
Franz Hofer
Werner Höfer
Hermann Höfle
Hermann Höfle (SS general)
Albert Hoffmann
Heinrich Hoffmann
Otto Hofmann
Ludwig Hohlwein
Walter Höllerer
Hans Egon Holthusen
Karl Holz
Eugen Hönig
Paul-Werner Hoppe
Heinrich Hörlein
Rudolf Höß
Franz Hössler 
Wilhelm Höttl
Waldemar Hoven
Franz Josef Huber
Adolf Hühnlein
Sigrid Hunke
Walter Huppenkothen
Hans Hüttig

I

Max Ilgner
Fritz Emil Irrgang
Alfred Ittner

J

Georg Jacoby
Emil Jaeger
Friedrich Gustav Jaeger
Karl Jäger
Erich Jahn
Franz Jakob
Gerhart Jander
Herbert Jankuhn
Herbert Janssen
Friedrich Jeckeln
Walter Jens
Georg Ludwig Jochum
Hanns Johst
Georg Joos
Oskar Joost
Pascual Jordan
Rudolf Jordan
Heinz Jost
Philipp Wilhelm Jung
Rudolf Jung
Hugo Jury
Hans Jüttner
Phil Jutzi

K

Oswald Kaduk
Karl Kahr
Anton Kaindl
Ernst Kaltenbrunner
Hans Kammler
Arthur Kampf
Herbert von Karajan
Wilhelm Karpenstein
Siegfried Kasche
Fritz Katzmann
Karl Kaufmann
Erich Kempka
Wilhelm Keppler
Erich Kern
Hanns Kerrl
Emil Ketterer
Walter von Keudell
Erich Keyser
Kurt Georg Kiesinger
Manfred Freiherr von Killinger
Emil Kirdorf
Hans Helmut Kirst
Gerhard Kittel
Dietrich Klagges
Hubert Klausner
Josef Klehr
Eugen Klöpfer
Gerhard Klopfer
Gustav Knittel
Helmut Knochen
Fritz Knöchlein
Franz Knoop
Erich Koch
Ilse Koch
Karl-Otto Koch
Max Koegel
Anneliese Kohlmann
Walter Köhler
Erwin Guido Kolbenheyer
Werner Kollath
Josef Kollmer
Max Kommerell
Franz Konrad (SS officer)
Horst Kopkow
Walter Kopp
Wilhelm Koppe
Erich Kordt
Viktor de Kowa
Hugo Kraas
Waldemar Kraft
Josef Kramer
Fritz Kranefuss
Carl Krauch
Albert Krebs
Hans Krebs (SS general)
Johann Kremer
Peter Kreuder
Ernst Krieck
Friedrich Wilhelm Kritzinger
Karl Krolow
Carl Vincent Krogmann
Bernhard Krüger
Friedrich-Wilhelm Krüger
Gerhard Krüger
Hans Krüger, SS-Hauptsturmführer 
Hans Krüger, Oberamtsrichter 
Gustav Krukenberg
Alfried Krupp von Bohlen und Halbach
Gustav Krupp von Bohlen und Halbach
Wilhelm Kube
Kurt Kühme
Hans Kühne
Werner Kuhnt
Richard Kunze
Franz Kutschera
Walter Kutschmann
Kurt Küttner

References

Bibliography
Klee, Ernst: Das Personenlexikon zum Dritten Reich. Wer war was vor und nach 1945. Fischer Taschenbuch Verlag, Zweite aktualisierte Auflage, Frankfurt am Main 2005 
Klee, Ernst Das Kulturlexikon zum Dritten Reich. Wer war was vor und nach 1945. S. Fischer, Frankfurt am Main 2007 
Snyder, Louis Leo, Encyclopedia of the Third Reich, Ware: Wordsworth Editions, 1998 (originally published New York City: McGraw-Hill, 1976)

External links
A-Z category of Nazi Party members on German Wikipedia

 
Nazis